Berkay Besler  (born 19 February 1999) is a Turkish racing driver competing internationally in the Porsche Supercup.

He was born in İnegöl, Bursa, Turkey on 19 February 1999. In 2019 he won his first Porsche GT3 Cup Challenge Middle East race at the Bahrain International Circuit. He then joined the Turkish racing team Borusan Otomotiv Motorsport to compete in the GT4 European Series driving a BMW M4 GT4 together with his teammate Cem Bölükbaşı.

Racing record

Prototype Cup Germany results

GT4 European Series results

References

Living people
1999 births
People from İnegöl
Sportspeople from Bursa
Turkish racing drivers
Porsche Supercup drivers
Walter Lechner Racing drivers
GT4 European Series drivers
Toksport WRT drivers